The UEFA Euro 2016 qualifying Group D was one of the nine groups to decide which teams would qualify for the UEFA Euro 2016 finals tournament. Group D consisted of six teams: Germany, Republic of Ireland, Poland, Scotland, Georgia, and Gibraltar, where they played against each other home-and-away in a round-robin format.

The top two teams, Germany and Poland, qualified directly for the finals. As third-placed Republic of Ireland weren't the highest-ranked among all third-placed teams, they advanced to the play-offs, where they won against Bosnia and Herzegovina and thus qualified as well.

Background 

The Germany national football team was looking to maintain its record of qualifying for every European Championship since 1972. Scotland and the Republic of Ireland both proposed the expansion of the European Championship and it was considered "ironic" by the Republic of Ireland manager, Martin O'Neill, that the two were drawn in the same group. The chairman of the Polish Football Association, Zbigniew Boniek, stated that he was happy with the draw. Georgia national football team manager, Temur Ketsbaia, said that the new system would give Georgia the chance to qualify and said that Georgia would aim for third place in the group.

The Gibraltar national football team competed in European Championship qualifying for the first time after becoming members of UEFA in May 2013. Gibraltar play their home matches at Estádio Algarve in Faro, Algarve, Portugal, as their home ground, Victoria Stadium, has an artificial pitch and does not meet UEFA international standards. They were initially drawn in UEFA Euro 2016 qualifying Group C, but with Spain—who claims the territory—already in that group, UEFA moved Gibraltar to Group D.

Standings

Matches 

The fixtures were released by UEFA the same day as the draw, which was held on 23 February 2014 in Nice. Times are CET/CEST, as listed by UEFA (local times are in parentheses).

Goalscorers

Discipline 
A player was automatically suspended for the next match for the following offences:
 Receiving a red card (red card suspensions could be extended for serious offences)
 Receiving three yellow cards in three different matches, as well as after fifth and any subsequent yellow card (yellow card suspensions were carried forward to the play-offs, but not the finals or any other future international matches)
The following suspensions were served during the qualifying matches:

Notes

References

External links 
UEFA Euro 2016 qualifying round Group D

Group D
2014 in Republic of Ireland association football
2015 in Republic of Ireland association football
2014–15 in Scottish football
2015–16 in Scottish football
2014–15 in German football
Qual
2014–15 in Polish football
Q
2014–15 in Gibraltar football
2015–16 in Gibraltar football
Gibraltar in international football
2014–15 in Georgian football
2015–16 in Georgian football
Qual